Ben Silbermann (born July 14, 1982) is an American Internet entrepreneur. He is the co-founder and executive chairman of Pinterest, a visual discovery engine. which lets users organize images, links, recipes and other things.

Early life 
Silbermann was born in 1982. He was raised in Des Moines, Iowa. His parents, Jane Wang and Neil Silbermann, are ophthalmologists. In 1998, Silbermann attended the Research Science Institute at MIT. He graduated from Des Moines Central Academy and Des Moines Roosevelt with the class of 1999. He then graduated from Yale University in the spring of 2003 with a degree in Political Science.

Career 
Before Pinterest (which launched in March 2010), Silbermann worked at Google in the online advertising group. However, after a short time with the company he left and started designing his own iPhone apps with a college friend, Paul Sciarra. After their initial application, Tote, failed to gain significant traction, the cofounders teamed up with Evan Sharp to create a pinboard product that would eventually be named Pinterest. Silbermann says that the genesis of Pinterest came from his love of collecting as a kid. "Collecting tells a lot about who you are," he said, and when they looked at the web "there wasn't a place to share that side of who you were." A little over nine years after starting Pinterest, the company held its IPO in April 2019 which valued the company around 12 billion dollars, beating expectations.

On June 28, 2022, it was announced Silberman would step down as Chief Executive Officer and transition to the role of Executive Chairman, and online commerce expert Bill Ready will become Chief Executive Officer and a member of the Board of Directors.

Personal life 
Silbermann is married to Divya Bhaskaran, with whom he has two children. He resides in San Francisco, California.

References 

Living people
1982 births
American people of Chinese descent
Businesspeople from Des Moines, Iowa
Businesspeople from San Francisco
Yale College alumni
American technology company founders
Y Combinator people
Pinterest people
American billionaires
Theodore Roosevelt High School (Iowa) alumni
American chief executives